Tower Mountain, is a prominent peak in the Taconic Mountains of western Massachusetts. The mountain is located in Pittsfield State Forest and is traversed by the  Taconic Crest hiking trail and the  multi-use Taconic Skyline Trail. The summit is partially open with views to the west; the slopes are wooded with northern hardwood tree species.

Tower Mountain is located within Hancock, Massachusetts; it shares the summit ridge with Pine Mountain to the east; Smith Mountain is located south along the ridgeline, and Berry Mountain to the north. It is bordered by West Hill to the west across the Wyomanock Creek valley. Tilden Swamp, a highland bog, is located just below the summit to the northeast. The west side of the mountain drains into Wyomanock Creek, then into Kinderhook Creek, thence into the Hudson River and Long Island Sound. The east side drains into Smith Brook, Parker Brook, and Onota Lake, thence to the Housatonic River and Long Island Sound.

References
 Massachusetts Trail Guide (2004). Boston: Appalachian Mountain Club.
 AMC Massachusetts and Rhode Island Trail Guide (1989). Boston: Appalachian Mountain Club.

External links
 Pittsfield State Forest map
 Pittsfield State Forest. Massachusetts DCR.

Mountains of Berkshire County, Massachusetts
Taconic Mountains